Vörehult is a small village in Kalmar Municipality, Kalmar County, Sweden. It has 9 inhabitants.

Populated places in Kalmar County